A volcano is a geological landform usually generated by the eruption through a vent in a planet's surface of magma.

Volcano may also refer to:

Geographical

Islands 
 Taal Volcano, also known as Volcano Island, in the Philippines
 Volcano Islands south of Japan, part of Bonin Islands
 Vulcano an island near Sicily, Italy

Towns 
 Volcano, California
 Bath, California or Volcano
 Volcano, Hawaii
 Volcano, West Virginia

Volcanoes 
 The Volcano (British Columbia), a cinder cone in British Columbia, Canada
 Volcano Mountain, a volcano in Yukon, Canada
 Volcano Vent, a volcano in British Columbia

Film and television 
 Volcano! (1926 film), an American silent film starring Bebe Daniels
 Volcano (1942 film), a short film based upon the DC Comics Superman
 Volcano (1950 film), an Italian-language film
 Krakatoa, East of Java or Volcano, a 1969 American film
 Volcano: An Inquiry into the Life and Death of Malcolm Lowry, a 1976 documentary film
 Volcano (1997 film), an action disaster film starring Tommy Lee Jones
 Volcano (2009 film), a German film featuring Pia Mechler
 Volcano (2011 film), an Icelandic film
 "Volcano" (South Park), a 1997 episode of South Park
 "Volcano", eighth episode of the 1966 Doctor Who serial The Daleks' Master Plan

Music

Bands and labels 
 Volcano Entertainment, a record label
 Volcano (supergroup), a punk/country supergroup from the United States
 Volcano! (band), an experimental band from Chicago, Illinois, United States

Albums 
 Volcano (Edie Brickell album) or its title song
 Volcano (Jimmy Buffett album) or its title song
 Volcano (Gatsbys American Dream album) (2005)
 Volcano (Satyricon album) (2002)
 Volcano (Temples album) (2017)
 Volcano (Volcano album) or its title song

Songs 
 "Volcano" (Jimmy Buffett song) (1979)
 "Volcano", a song by the Band from Cahoots
 "Volcano", a song by Beck from Modern Guilt
 "Volcano", a song by Bell X1 from Neither Am I 
 "Volcano", a 2017 song by Brooke Candy
 "Volcano", a song by Dethklok from Dethalbum II
 "Volcano", a song by the Presidents of the United States of America from II
 "Volcano", a song by Red Plastic Bag
 ’’Volcano’’ a song by The Vamps from Wake Up
 "Volcano", a song by Damien Rice from O
 "Volcano", a song by Swans from Soundtracks for the Blind

Sports 
 Salem-Keizer Volcanoes, a minor league baseball team in Keizer, Oregon
 Vancouver Volcanoes, an International Basketball League franchise in Vancouver
 Lesley Vainikolo or Volcano (born 1979), rugby player

Other uses 
 Volcano (brand), a clothing brand
 Volcano: The Blast Coaster, a roller coaster at Kings Dominion
 Volcano, a South Devon Railway Tornado class steam locomotives
 Volcano! (gamebook), a book in the original Choose Your Own Adventure series
 Volcano H-2, a Yemeni ballistic missile

See also 
 Al-Burkan, Libyan exile dissident group in the 1980s
 Ixcanul, a 2015 Guatemalan film
 The Volcano (disambiguation)
 Volcan (disambiguation)
 Volcanic (disambiguation)
 Vulcan (disambiguation)
 Vulkan (disambiguation)